Plymouth College is a co-educational private school in Plymouth, Devon.

History
The school was established in 1877. In 1896 Plymouth College bought Mannamead School (founded in 1854), and was temporarily known as Plymouth and Mannamead College.

In 1976, the first girls were admitted to the school's sixth form. Plymouth College became fully coeducational in 1995. In 2004, the school absorbed St Dunstan's Abbey School, an independent school for girls founded by Lydia Sellon.

The Whiteworks Outward Bound centre on Dartmoor has a 20-bed bunkhouse.

Sports
The swimming programme has a partnership with the Plymouth Leander Swimming Club. At the 2012 Olympic Games, Rūta Meilutytė won the gold medal in the 100m breaststroke for Lithuania.
In 2019, the under-14 girls hockey team won the national tier 2 championships

Former teachers 

 Henry John Chaytor

Notable alumni

Paul Ackford
Michael Ball
Steve Banyard
Patrick K. Collins
Chris Constantinou
Sir Alfred Woodley Croft
William Crossing
Richard Deacon

Stephen Davies
Sir Rolf Dudley-Williams
John Fabian
Michael Foot  
Dawn French
Wilson Harris
Stuart Hibberd
Frank Hoar
Jade Howard
William James
Ronald Jasper
Alexis Kirke
Jamila Lunkuse
Jake Libby
Alexander Macklin
David Forbes Martyn
Sir Alexander Maxwell
Rūta Meilutytė
Cassie Patten
Finn Peters
David Quantick
Sir Leonard Rogers
Paul Seymour
Henry Slade
Milos Stankovic
Walter Stoneman
Mark Tavener
Kavus Torabi
John Trevaskis
J. C. Trewin
Miles Tunnicliff
Grace Neutral

References

External links 

Profile on the Independent Schools Council website

Private schools in Plymouth, Devon
Member schools of the Headmasters' and Headmistresses' Conference
International Baccalaureate schools in England
Boarding schools in Devon
Educational institutions established in 1877
1877 establishments in England